Eva de Vitray-Meyerovitch (5 November 1909 – 24 July 1999) was a French scholar of Islam, a researcher at the Centre national de la recherche scientifique (CNRS), and a translator and writer, who published a total of forty books and numerous articles. She was a disciple of the Sufi master Hamza al Qadiri al Boutchichi.

Life

Eva Lamacque de Vitray was born on November 5, 1909 in Boulogne-Billancourt, an affluent Parisian suburb. From a privileged social background, she was educated in Catholic schools before studying for a law degree. She began a doctorate in philosophy on the subject of "Symbolism in Plato."

At the age of 22, Eva married Lazare Meyerovitch, of Latvian Jewish origins. She became an administrator in the laboratory of Frédéric Joliot-Curie. In 1940 Eva escaped from Paris with Joliot-Curie during the German occupation of Paris and retired to the Corrèze department for the duration of the war. Eva's husband was a member of the Free French Forces. After the liberation of France, Eva joined the CNRS, where she soon became director of the human sciences department. She earned an income from translations. She met orientalist Louis Massignon, with whom she would remain closely linked and who supported her after the sudden death of her husband in the early 1950s.

Eva discovered Islam through the book The Reconstruction of Religious Thought in Islam by poet and author Muhammad Iqbal. After three years of studying Christian exegesis at the Sorbonne, she chose to become a Muslim. She took the Arabic name Hawwa, a translation of her Christian name. Eva was very interested in the work of the Persian poet Jalâl ud Dîn Rûmî (1207–1273), through whom she became aware of the mystical aspect of Islam, Sufism. Subsequently, she embarked on learning Persian. Soon afterward, she published her first translations of Muhammad Iqbal and Rumi into French.

In 1968, Eva defended her doctoral dissertation at the University of Paris on Mystical Themes in the Work of Jalal Ud Dîn Rûmî. From 1969 to 1973, she taught in Cairo at Al-Azhar University. In 1971, she made the pilgrimage to Mecca and also visited Medina. From 1972 until her death, she regularly published annotated translations of Rûmi's writings and works she wrote herself on Islam, Sufism, and the whirling dervishes. In 1990, she published her translation of Rumi's Masnavi, a colossal work of 50,000 verses in 1,700 pages, translated for the first time into French.

Parallel to her academic career, Eva pursued a personal quest that led her to meet many personalities involved in Sufism, such as Amadou Hampâté Ba, Najm Oud Din Bammate, Cheikh Bentounès, and Faouzi Skali. Through Skali, in Morocco in 1985, she met a living Sufi spiritual guide, Hamza al Qadiri al Boutchichi, whose teaching she would follow until her death. She was also active as a speaker in France and abroad on Rumi, Islam, and Sufism. In addition, she recorded several programs for France Culture and television. In 1998, during her last conference in Turkey, she expressed the wish to be buried in Konya.

Eva de Vitray-Meyerovitch died on July 24, 1999, in her apartment on rue Claude-Bernard in Paris. She was buried in a private ceremony in Thiais, in the Paris region. In 2003, steps were taken to transfer her remains to Konya, which was finalized in 2008. On November 17, 2008, an official ceremony accompanied the burial of the coffin of Vitray-Meyerovitch in Konya. Her grave is opposite the mausoleum of Jalal ud Din Rumi.

Publications

As author

 [Republished in 1986 and 1995, Albin Michel, coll. Spiritualités vivantes, 132. Work translated into Italian]

 [Work translated into Spanish and Turkish]
 [Work translated into Spanish]

 [Republished in 2004, Albin Michel. Work translated into Italian, Spanish and Catalan] 
 [Work translated into Turkish]
 [Work translated into Italian, German and Turkish]

 [Republished in 2003, Albin Michel, coll. Spiritualités vivantes. Work translated into Italian and Turkish]
 [Republished in 2005, collection Points Sagesses. Work translated into English, Romanian, Portuguese, Bosnian and Czech]

Translations from Persian

 Republished in 1982 and 1997, Albin Michel, coll. Spiritualités vivantes. Also translated in Italian and Spanish.

 republished in 2003, Points Sagesses

 republished in 2003, Albin Michel, coll. Spiritualités vivantes.

Translations from English

 [Reprinted in 1996 by du Rocher / UNESCO]

Notes

Sources

External links

1909 births
1999 deaths
French Sufis
French scholars of Islam
Converts to Islam from Christianity
English–French translators
Arabic–French translators
Translators from Persian
Translators to French
20th-century French translators
Women scholars of Islam
French Muslims
Women orientalists
People from Boulogne-Billancourt
Scholars of Sufism
Iqbal scholars